Natura Siberica is a organic cosmetics company based in Moscow, Russia. The company aims to provide natural products made from wild Siberian plants and herbs.

As of 2017 Natura Siberica operates 70 own brand stores, and sells its products in more than 40 countries. As of March 2019 Natura Siberica produces up to 200 different products, including products for body, skin, hair, and makeup which are sold in 60 countries.

The company operates three plants in Russia, and in 2014 it set up a production facility in a former Coca-Cola plant in Estonia. Overall, the company employs about 4,000 people.

History
Natura Siberica was founded by Andrey Trubnikov in 2008. 

Andrey Trubnikov passed away intestate on 7 January 2021, due to consequences of chronic diseases.

Trubnikov's loss provoked a huge corporate dispute, because his 60% stake was automatically put under trust and crisis management and 40% stake belongs to his 1st wife, Irina Trubnikova. 
On the 1st of September 2021, Natura Siberica stopped the production and sales of several company's trademarks and 80 retail stores were closed, after OU Good Design of Irina Trubnikova terminated the multi-license contract with "Pervoye Reshenie", main legal entity of Natura Siberica, as well as with Natura Siberica operational company.

On 21 May 2020, a huge fire accident took place at Dmitrovsky pilot plant of aluminium tin tapes in facilities, rented by Natura Siberica. The plant was inevitably almost burnt. Two claims were put at the Arbitration court by the plant as well as by En+Recycling company, whose claim was subsequently replaced by Ingosstrakh. In August 2021, according to the court's decision, all belongings of "Pervoye Reshenie", main legal entity of Natura Siberica company, was put under arrest. Two employees of Natura Siberica were also found guilty.

In September 2021, the Arbitration court of Moscow region charged Natura Siberica to pay about 2,9 billion roubles, upholding in part the claim of Ingosstrakh (1,494 billion roubles instead of 1,5) and of Dmitrovsky pilot plant of aluminium tin tapes (1,365 billion roubles instead of 2,7), both related to Oleg Deripaska. Only a couple days after, Natura Siberica put three claims, one of them being about 1,67 billion roubles, in the Arbitration court of Moscow against Irina Trubnikova, co-owner of the company and 1st wife of Andrey Trubnikov, as well as against her Estonian-based company, OU Good Design. The respondent party is supposed to make detrimental actions for Natura Siberica reputation and financial health by funneling abroad its underpriced trademarks in 2020. At the end of September 2021, Natura Siberica fired Irina Trubnikova with dismissal for absence without leave and for injuries to the business. In January 2022, Natura Siberica production resumed its activity in Dmitrov under the new CEO of all holding`s companies, Felix Lieb, former Sistema top-manager.

References

External links
 

Cosmetics companies of Russia
Companies based in Moscow
Russian brands